The 2019 Abruzzo regional election took place on 10 February 2019. The election was for all 29 elected seats of the Regional Council of Abruzzo as well as the President of the region who, along with the second placed presidential candidate, would also become members of the Regional Council.  

The ballot resulted in the election of Marco Marsilio, the centre-right candidate, as President of the Regional Council with 48% of the votes. Moreover, the League won a plurality of seats in the Regional Council.

Electoral law 
The candidate who obtains the majority of valid votes at the regional level becomes president. Every candidate must be linked to a party list or a coalition running for the regional council. A majority of 60% to 65% of the seats is then allocated to the party (or coalition) of the elected president.

The election of the Council occurs on a regional basis within the four districts of Abruzzo, coinciding with the four provinces of the Region. The district of Chieti elects eight councilors, while Pescara, L'Aquila and Teramo each elect seven councillors. The President of the Council and the presidential candidate, who received the second largest number of votes, also become members of the regional council.

The electoral system is proportional to the share of the votes each party revives, with an electoral threshold of 4% of the vote for parties that are not  members of coalitions and 2% for those included in a coalition.

Campaign 
During the campaign, Marco Marsilio (member of FdI) was criticized for not being native to the region, with opponents accusing him of lacking knowledge about the specific regional issues. However Marsilio's parents are both natives of Abruzzo. Members of the Democratic Party (PD) also accused the League of violating Italian campaigning laws, after Matteo Salvini posted a tweet calling on voters to go and vote for his party, during the period of time in which the electoral campaign is officially closed.

Parties and candidate

Opinion polls

Results

Voter turnout

</onlyinclude>

References

Elections in Abruzzo
2019 elections in Italy
February 2019 events in Italy